De-Cossackization (Russian: Расказачивание, Raskazachivaniye) was the Bolshevik policy of systematic repressions against Cossacks of the Russian Empire, especially of the Don and the Kuban, between 1919 and 1933 aimed at the elimination of the Cossacks as a distinct collectivity by exterminating the Cossack elite, coercing all other Cossacks into compliance and eliminating Cossack distinctness. The campaign began in March 1919 in response to growing Cossack insurgency. According to Nicolas Werth, one of the authors of The Black Book of Communism, Soviet leaders deciding to "eliminate, exterminate, and deport the population of a whole territory", which they had taken to calling the "Soviet Vendée". The de-Cossackization is sometimes described as a genocide of the Cossacks, although this view is disputed, with some historians asserting that this label is an exaggeration. The process has been described by scholar Peter Holquist as part of a "ruthless" and "radical attempt to eliminate undesirable social groups" that showed the Soviet regime's "dedication to social engineering". Throughout this period, the policy underwent significant modifications, which resulted in the "normalization" of Cossacks as a component part of Soviet society.

Background
Cossacks were simultaneously both an ethnicity and a grouping of special social estates in the Russian Empire from the 16th to the early 20th century. Because of their military tradition, Cossack forces played an important role in Russia's wars of the 17th–20th centuries such as the Crimean War (1853-1856), the Napoleonic Wars, various Russo-Turkish Wars, and the First World War of 1914-1918. In the late-19th and early-20th centuries, the tsarist regime deployed Cossack detachments to perform police service and to suppress revolutionary movements, especially in 1905–1907.

Following the October Revolution of 1917, a conflict broke out between the new Bolshevik Communist regime in Russia and many Cossacks. In the Don territory, the Ataman of the Don Cossacks, Alexey Kaledin, declared that he would "offer full support, in close alliance with the governments of the other Cossack hosts" to Kerensky's forces. Establishing ties with the Ukrainian Central Rada and with the Kuban, Terek, and Orenburg hosts, Kaledin sought to overthrow the Soviet regime in Russia. On 15 November 1917 Generals Kornilov, Alekseev and Denikin began to organize the force that would become the Volunteer Army in the Cossack cultural capital, Novocherkassk. Imposing martial law, Kaledin moved in late November. On , after a seven-day battle, his forces occupied Rostov. However, on  Bolshevik troops occupied Rostov and Novocherkassk.

After the Imperial German army invaded and occupied Rostov on May 8, 1918, a government headed by Ataman Krasnov formed in the Don province. In July 1918 the White Cossack forces of Ataman Krasnov launched their first invasion of Tsaritsyn (present-day Volgograd). Soviet forces counterattacked and drove out the White Cossacks by September 7. On September 22, Krasnov's forces launched a second invasion of Tsaritsyn, but by October 25 Soviet troops had thrown Krasnov's forces back beyond the Don. On January 1, 1919, Krasnov launched a third invasion of Tsaritsyn. Soviet forces repelled the invasion and forced Krasnov's forces to withdraw from Tsaritsyn in mid-February 1919.

History 
The policy was established by a secret resolution of the Bolshevik Party on January 24, 1919, which ordered local branches to "carry out mass terror against wealthy Cossacks, exterminating all of them; carry out merciless mass terror against any and all Cossacks taking part in any way, directly or indirectly, in the struggle against Soviet power". On 7 February the Southern Front issued its own instructions on how the resolution was to be applied: "The main duty of stanitsa and khutor executive committees is to neutralize the Cossackry through the merciless extirpation of its elite. District and Stanitsa atamans are subject to unconditional elimination, [but] khutor atamans should be subject to execution only in those cases where it can be proved that they actively supported Krasnov's policies (having organized pacification, conducted mobilization, refused to offer refuge to revolutionary Cossacks or to Red Army men)."

In mid-March 1919 alone, Cheka forces executed more than 8,000 Cossacks. In each stanitsa, summary judgements were passed by revolutionary courts within minutes, and whole lists of people were condemned to execution for "counterrevolutionary behavior."

The Don region was required by the Soviets to make a grain contribution equal to the total annual production of the area. Almost all Cossacks joined the Green Army or other rebel forces. Together with Baron Wrangel's troops, they forced the Red Army out of the region in August 1920. After the retaking of the Crimea by Red Army, the Cossacks again became victims of the Red Terror. Special commissions in charge of de-Cossackization condemned more than 6,000 people to death in October 1920 alone. The families and often the neighbors of suspected rebels were taken as hostages.

"Gathered together in a camp near Maikop, the hostages, women, children and old men survive in the most appalling conditions, in the cold and the mud of October... They are dying like flies. The women will do anything to escape death. The soldiers guarding the camp take advantage of this and treat them as prostitutes."

In November 1920 Feliks Dzerzhinsky, head of the Cheka, reported to Lenin:

the republic has to organize the internment in camps of about 100,000 prisoners from the Southern front and vast masses of people expelled from the rebellious [Cossack] settlements of the Terek, the Kuban, and the Don. Today 403 Cossack men and women aged between 14 and 17 arrived in Oryol for internment in the internment camp. They cannot be accepted as Oryol is already overloaded.

The Pyatigorsk Cheka organized a "day of Red Terror" to execute 300 people in one day. They ordered local Communist Party organizations to draw up execution lists. According to one of the chekists, "this rather unsatisfactory method led to a great deal of private settling of old scores. ... In Kislovodsk, for lack of a better idea, it was decided to kill people who were in the hospital." Many Cossack towns were burned to the ground, and all survivors deported on the orders by Sergo Ordzhonikidze who was head of the Revolutionary Committee of the Northern Caucasus.

Commentary
The deportations and exterminations are considered genocide by some scholars, although this view is disputed. According to Peter Holquist, it would be an exaggeration to claim that de-Cossackization constituted a "Cossack genocide".

Despite there being more than a million Cossacks before 1917, very few people consider themselves Cossacks today. Shane O'Rourke states that the de-Cossackization "was one of the main factors which led to the disappearance of the Cossacks as a nation". Alexander Nikolaevich Yakovlev, head of the Presidential Committee for the Rehabilitation of Victims of Political Repression, notes that "hundreds of thousands of Cossacks were killed". Robert Gellately claims that "the most reliable estimates indicate that between 300,000 and 500,000 were killed or deported in 1919–20" out of a population of around three million.

According to Łukasz Adamski and Bartłomiej Gajos, the number of people who perished during the de-Cossackization is largely contentious, stating that the death toll numbers range from "a few thousand to incredible claims of hundreds of thousands". 

Peter Holquist states the overall number of executions is difficult to establish; in some regions, hundreds were executed, while the tribunal was very active in Khoper, with a one-month total of 226 executions. The Tsymlianskaia tribunal oversaw the execution of over 700 people. The Kotel'nikovo tribunal executed 117 in early May and nearly 1,000 overall. Others were not quite as active. The Berezovskaia tribunal made a total of twenty arrests in a community of 13,500 people. Holquist also notes that some of White reports of Red atrocities in the Don were consciously scripted for agitation purposes. In one example, an insurgent leader reported that 140 were executed in Bokovskaia, but later provided a different account, according to which only eight people in Bokovskaia were sentenced to death, and the authorities did not manage to carry these sentences out. Holquist emphasizes that he is "not seeking to downplay or dismiss very real executions by the Soviets". Overall, he estimates a death toll of around 10,000 from de-Cossackization.

Research by Pavel Polian from Russian Academy of Sciences on the subject of forced settlements in the Soviet Union shows that more than 45,000 Cossacks were deported from the Terek Oblast to Ukraine. Their land was distributed among pro-soviet Cossacks and Chechens.

According to the Dictionary of Genocides, the "genocidal treatment" of the Cossacks was based on class, ethnicity and politics and part of a broader Bolshevik policy of remaking society.

See also
 Dekulakization
 Mass killings under communist regimes
 Population transfer in the Soviet Union

References

External links
 Soviet order to exterminate Cossacks is unearthed University of York Communications Office, 21 January 2003

History of the Cossacks in Russia
Ethnic groups in the Soviet Union
Political repression in the Soviet Union
Soviet ethnic policy
Forced migration in the Soviet Union